Alessandro Stefano Cugurra Rodrigues (born 25 July 1974), also known as Stefano Cugurra and nicknamed as Teco, is a Brazilian football coach. who is the current head coach of Indonesian club Bali United.

Started his career in Indonesia as a physical coach at Persebaya Surabaya in 2004, he rose into prominence when he was coaching Persija Jakarta in late 2017. In 2018, he brought Persija to its first Indonesian top league title since 2001. Afterwards, he moved to Bali United, in which he won his second consecutive league title; it is the first Balinese club to win an Indonesian top league title.

Managerial career

Bali United
On 14 January 2019, Bali United appointed Cugurra as their new manager, replacing Widodo Cahyono Putro. On the same day eight new players were announced. The players are Gunawan Dwi Cahyo, Michael Orah, Samuel Reimas, Ahmad Maulana Putra, Gusti Sandria, Haudi Abdillah, Leonard Tupamahu, and a Brazilian player Willian Pacheco. Cugurra's first competitive match in charge was a 3-0 win against Blitar United in the second-round of 2018-19 Piala Indonesia. In February, Cugurra signed Portuguese midfielder Paulo Sérgio to fill up the foreign player quota. On 16 May 2019, Cugurra's first league game, against Persebaya ended with a 2-1 win for his team, thanks to goal from Spasojević and new signing Paulo Sérgio, who scored on his debut.

Honours

Manager
Persija Jakarta
 Liga 1: 2018
Bali United
 Liga 1: 2019, 2021–22

 Individual
 Liga 1 Best Coach: 2018, 2019
 APPI Indonesian Soccer Awards Best Coach: 2019

References

External links
 Alessandro Stefano Cugurra Rodrigues's Biodata
 Profile at Goal

1974 births
Living people
Footballers from Rio de Janeiro (city)

Brazilian football managers

Kuala Muda Naza F.C. players
Stefano Cugurra
Stefano Cugurra
Stefano Cugurra
Stefano Cugurra
Persija Jakarta managers
Bali United F.C. managers

Indonesia Super League managers
Stefano Cugurra

Brazilian expatriate sportspeople in Indonesia
Expatriate football managers in Indonesia
Brazilian expatriate sportspeople in Malaysia
Expatriate football managers in Malaysia
Brazilian expatriate sportspeople in Thailand
Expatriate football managers in Thailand